Gregor Nils Henric Adlercreutz (16 August 1898 – 3 June 1944) was a Swedish equestrian who competed in the 1936 Summer Olympics. He and his horse Teresina placed fourth in the individual dressage competition and won a bronze medal with the Swedish dressage team. Adlercreutz was captain in the Scanian cavalry regiment and studied at a cavalry school in Hanover in 1937–38. His father Nils was also an Olympic equestrian and headed the Scanian regiment in 1921–27.

Adlercreutz died on 3 June 1944 in Strömsholm and was buried at Norra begravningsplatsen in Solna.

References

1898 births
1944 deaths
Swedish Army officers
Sportspeople from Stockholm
Swedish dressage riders
Olympic equestrians of Sweden
Swedish male equestrians
Equestrians at the 1936 Summer Olympics
Olympic bronze medalists for Sweden
Olympic medalists in equestrian
Medalists at the 1936 Summer Olympics
Burials at Norra begravningsplatsen

Gregor
Swedish nobility